Malvín Norte is a barrio (neighbourhood or district) located in north eastern part of Montevideo, Uruguay.

Location
This barrio shares borders with Unión to the west, Maroñas to the north, Las Canteras to the east, Malvín and Buceo to the south.

History 
The neighborhood was the site of a multiyear conflict in 1987-1992 about the emissions of lead-contaminated smoke from the Gonzalez Hemanos S.A. metal smelters.

Landmarks
It is home to the Faculty of Sciences of the University of the Republic of Uruguay.

See also 
Barrios of Montevideo

References

External links 
 Extensión Universitaria - Universidad de la República (includes video)

Barrios of Montevideo